JG Summit Holdings, Inc. (JGSHI) is one of the largest conglomerates in the Philippines with business interests in air transportation, banking, food manufacturing, hotels, petrochemicals, power generation, publishing, real estate and property development, and telecommunications. Key subsidiaries include Universal Robina and Cebu Pacific.  Incorporated on November 1990, JG Summit Holdings was founded by John Gokongwei Jr., one of the wealthiest individuals in Southeast Asia.  In 2010, JGSHI was one of the ten most profitable companies on the Philippine Stock Exchange.

Companies

Manufacturing
 JG Summit Petrochemical Corporation
 JG Summit Olefins Corporation
Universal Robina Corporation - is one of the largest branded consumer food and beverage product companies in the Philippines.
 Griffin's Foods (New Zealand)
 Snack Brands Australia (Australia)

Real estate
 Robinsons Land Corporation (including Robinsons Malls)
 United Industrial Corporation Ltd. (Singapore) - 37% ownership

Air transport
 Cebu Pacific
Aviation Partnership Philippines - 49% ownership
SIA Engineering (Philippines) Corporation - 35% ownership
 LIPAD Corporation (operator of Clark International Airport) - a consortium with Filinvest Development Corporation, Philippine Airport Ground Support Solutions Inc., and Changi Airports Philippines Pte. Ltd.

Financial
 Robinsons Bank Corporation

Utilities
Global Business Power Corporation (30%)
PLDT, Inc. (11.27%)
Meralco (29.56%)

Others
 iTech Global Business Solutions, Inc.
 Go Hotels
 Robinsons Hotels & Resorts
 Summit Hotels and Resorts
 Summit Media
 DHL Summit Solutions Inc.

Former businesses

Digital Telecommunications Philippines (Digitel and Sun Cellular) - Acquired by PLDT last March 2011. As part of the deal, JG Summit will have a 12% share in PLDT. It was finalized by the National Telecommunications Commission last October 26, 2011.
Far East Bank and Trust Company - Sold the shares to BPI during the time PCIBank was acquired by Equitable, the GSIS and the SSS.
Philippine Commercial International Bank (PCI Bank) - A joint venture between Benpres, and the Lopez Group of Companies. Both sold their shares in 1999 to the SSS and GSIS which gave way to the Equitable Banking Corporation - Philippine Commercial International Bank merger and eventually became Banco de Oro Universal Bank.

References

Further reading

External links 

 JG Summit corporate website

Gokongwei Group
 
Companies listed on the Philippine Stock Exchange
Companies based in Pasig
Conglomerate companies of the Philippines